Raymond Brackley Strange (27 October 1878 – 17 September 1962) was a New Zealand cricketer. He played in nine first-class matches for Canterbury from 1901 to 1904. He later lived in Australia.

Life and career
Born in Christchurch, Strange took a wicket with his first ball in first-class cricket: in his second match, he ended Hawke's Bay's first innings by bowling the last batsman, Tom Dent, with his only delivery. Not until the 1988–89 season did another New Zealander (Stephen Hotter) take a wicket with his first ball in first-class cricket.

Strange was only an occasional bowler. He played as a batsman, and made his highest score of 52 against Wellington in January 1904. He was selected to represent South Island against North Island later that month, when he failed as an opening batsman but took four wickets in South Island's narrow victory. It was his last first-class match.

Strange moved to Sydney in December 1904 and lived in Parramatta, where he married Meta Mance in January 1910. In 1932 he set up a business with Meta as a manufacturer's representative in Hobart, but she died there in June 1934. They had four daughters. He spent some years working as a book-keeper on a sheep station in the Riverina region of New South Wales before returning to Sydney, where he died in September 1962, aged 83.

See also
 List of Canterbury representative cricketers

References

External links
 

1878 births
1962 deaths
New Zealand cricketers
Canterbury cricketers
Cricketers from Christchurch
South Island cricketers
New Zealand emigrants to Australia